Kristjan Järvan (born 10 October 1990) is an Estonian politician. He serves as Minister of Entrepreneurship and Information Technology in the second cabinet of Prime Minister Kaja Kallas.

References 

Living people
1990 births
Place of birth missing (living people)
Government ministers of Estonia
21st-century Estonian politicians
University of Tartu alumni
Politicians from Tallinn